The men's 102 kilograms competition at the 2018 World Weightlifting Championships was held on 8 November 2018.

Schedule

Medalists

Records

Results

References

External links
Results 
Results Group A
Results Group B

Men's 102 kg